Poker bracelet may refer to:
World Series of Poker bracelet, awarded to the winner of every event at the annual World Series of Poker
World Series of Poker multiple bracelet winners
World Poker Tour bracelet